The Linda Hall Library is a privately endowed American library of science, engineering and technology located in Kansas City, Missouri, sitting "majestically on a  urban arboretum." It is the "largest independently funded public library of science, engineering and technology in North America" and "among the largest science libraries in the world."

Description
Established in 1946 through the philanthropy of Linda (1859–1938) and Herbert F. Hall (1858–1941), of the Hall-Bartlett Grain Co., the library has achieved global recognition and stature. The library is open to the public with individual researchers, academic institutions and companies from Kansas City and around the world using the library’s extensive research-level collection. Though not affiliated with its neighbor, the University of Missouri-Kansas City, many students and faculty from UMKC and other local colleges and universities utilize the library each day.

The library's William N. Deramus III Cosmology Theater shows images of the cosmos from the Hubble Space Telescope and NASA science missions. These images are delivered via ViewSpace to the library with daily updates (via the Internet) that provide the library with new content for visitors.

"The Tazza", one of the largest pieces of malachite in North America, stands as the focal point in the center of the main reading room, which features parquet wood floors, paneling and bookshelves of oak, and large windows that overlook the south lawn.

Collections
The library's collection numbers over 2 million items. It was initially established by the purchase of the 62,358 books and other items—assembled by John Adams before he became president—that had belonged to the American Academy of Arts and Sciences. It includes academic journals, academic conference proceedings, reference works, publications by the government, and technical reports, industrial standards, engineering society conference papers, U.S. patents, and monographs. In 1995, the Engineering Societies Library (ESL) was transferred to the library, an acquisition equal in significance to the Academy collection, and greater in terms of the number of volumes received. The ESL collection added depth to both the journal and monograph collections, containing publications of many engineering societies, including the American Institute of Aeronautics and Astronautics, the American Society of Civil Engineers, American Institute of Chemical Engineers, the American Society of Mechanical Engineers, the American Institute of Mining, Metallurgical, and Petroleum Engineers, and the Institute of Electrical and Electronics Engineers.

History of Science Collection
The library's distinguished History of Science Collection contains more than 50,000 volumes, including first editions of many landmarks of science and technology. Some of the oldest books date to the fifteenth century. The oldest book in the collection is a 1472 printing of Pliny the Elder's Naturalis Historia (Natural History).

Online
A number of works can be accessed online, including:
Georg Joachim Rheticus Narratio Prima (Gdańsk, 1540)
 Tycho Brahe Astronomicall Coniectur (1632)
 George Catlin North American Indian Portfolio (1844)

Historic holdings
The collection includes other important scientific works (many written in New Latin and other languages), including:
 Nicolaus Copernicus, De revolutionibus orbium coelestium (Nuremberg, 1543)
 Leonhard Fuchs, De historia stirpium commentarii insignes (Basel, 1542)
 Galileo Galilei, Sidereus nuncius (Venice, 1610)
 Francis Bacon, Instauratio magna (including the Novum Organum) (London, 1620)
 Isaac Newton, Philosophiae naturalis principia mathematica (London, 1687)
 Georges Buffon, Histoire Naturelle, générale et particulière, avec la description du Cabinet du Roi (Paris, 17491804)
 Charles Darwin, On the Origin of Species (London, 1859)

Grounds and arboretum

The 14-acre grounds surrounding the library are home to over 338 trees representing some 52 genera and 145 species. The arboretum and gardens are further embellished by beds of viburnum, tree peonies and Missouri native woodland plants. Seven trees on the property have been designated Greater Kansas City Champion Trees and represent the largest specimens of their species in the metropolitan area: Sweet Birch, European Hornbeam, Hardy Rubber Tree, Double Flowered Horsechestnut, Rivers Purple Beech, Yulan Magnolia, and Anise Leaf Magnolia. The National Wildlife Federation’s Backyard Wildlife Habitat Program has awarded a certificate of merit to the library for its efforts in preserving the natural habitat of the grounds.

References

External links

 Official website
 Libraries.org Linda Hall entry page
 Linda Hall Library's Transcontinental Railroad educational site with free, full-text access to 19th century American railroad periodicals
 Linda Hall Library History of Science Collection, C-SPAN video, BookTV Bus, May 12, 2008
 Linda Hall Library: a Gem of Science Knowledge video by KSHB NBC Action News
 "Linda Hall", Barbara Magerl, The Pendergast Years: Kansas City in the Jazz Age & Great Depression, Kansas City Public Library Digital History.

1946 establishments in Missouri
Buildings and structures in Kansas City, Missouri
Research libraries in the United States
Science libraries in the United States
Tourist attractions in Kansas City, Missouri